"I'm in Heaven (When You Kiss Me)" is a song by Eurodance group ATC. It was released in July 2001 as the lead single from their second album Touch the Sky.

Music video
The music video starts out with a group of people looking up onto the night sky and spotting a luminous beam of light. It later zooms into a barren foreign planet where ATC are sitting and looking up into the sky. The group then stands up and walks through a grasslands, ending up in front of a tree full of bubbles instead of leaves, which they all later get trapped inside of. They all start floating up high into the sky inside of their respective bubbles, hence the album's name, Touch the Sky. They all then manage to escape the bubbles and land back onto the grasslands. The group then arrives in a winter setting where they ride unicorns and later spout angel wings, then proceed to fly up into outer space. Whilst flying through outer space, they land on a flying stingray and dance on top of it. They are later sent back to the grasslands from earlier, and now continue to dance with the group of people seen at the very beginning. Later, only the group of people are warped back to planet Earth, dubbed as "wonderland", leaving ATC in outer space, with one girl having a necklace that glows up as a gift from ATC.

Track listing
CD maxi - Europe (2001)
"I'm in Heaven (When You Kiss Me)" (Radio Edit 5 Inch-Version) - 3:47
"I'm in Heaven (When You Kiss Me)" (Radio Edit 12 Inch-Version) - 4:36
"I'm in Heaven (When You Kiss Me)" (Record Rescue @ Blue PM Mix) - 4:16
"I'm in Heaven (When You Kiss Me)" (BKA 2 Blue PM Mix) - 3:55
"I'm in Heaven (When You Kiss Me)" (Disco Mix) - 3:50
"I'm in Heaven (When You Kiss Me)" (Trance Ibiza Space Mix) - 5:51
"I'm in Heaven (When You Kiss Me)" (Club Pop Mix) - 4:26

Charts

References

2001 songs
2001 singles
A Touch of Class (band) songs
Sony BMG singles
Songs written by Alex Christensen
Songs about kissing